The 13th Division was an infantry division of the United States Army. It was established at Camp Lewis, Washington, in 1918, during World War I. The war ended before the division saw combat, and it was inactivated in 1919.

Creation
The 13th Division was activated at Camp Lewis, Washington on July 16, 1918 as part of the U.S. military mobilization for World War I.  It was manned and trained at Camp Lewis in preparation for combat in France, and formed from a few existing units as the organization's nucleus, while draftees, predominantly from the West Coast of the United States, filled out the majority of the division.

The "square" 13th Division's complement of four regiments included the 1st, 44th, 75th, and 76th Infantry Regiments.  In August 1918, the regiments were organized to form two brigades—the 25th (1st and 75th Regiments, plus the 38th Machine Gun Battalion) -- and the 26th Brigade (44th and 76th Regiments, plus the 39th Machine Gun Battalion).

Task organization
 13th Division Headquarters Troop 
 25th Infantry Brigade
 26th Infantry Brigade 
 13th Field Artillery Brigade
37th Field Artillery Regiment
38th Field Artillery Regiment
39th Field Artillery Regiment
13th Trench Mortar Battery
213th Engineer Regiment
213th Field Signal Battalion
13th Train Headquarters and Military Police
13th Supply Train
213th Engineer Train
13th Ammunition Train
13th Sanitary Train
 249th Field Hospital and Ambulance Company 
 250th Field Hospital and Ambulance Company 
 251st Field Hospital and Ambulance Company 
 252nd Field Hospital and Ambulance Company

Community support
Cornelius Vanderbilt III served as the division's interim commander in the summer of 1918.  As they had for the recently departed 91st Division, community leaders welcomed Vanderbilt at a formal reception which took place at the newly-constructed Camp Lewis gymnasium, and included an orchestra, and more than 1,000 guests, including Governor Ernest Lister.  In addition to the reception for Vanderbilt, the civilian community welcomed the 13th Division's soldiers with public events, including a picnic and a track meet.

Horace R. Cayton Sr., the publisher of Cayton's Weekly and Seattle's first African American journalist, criticized Vanderbilt for barring black troops from Camp Lewis's most popular recreation center.  He had also segregated the camp's Young Women's Christian Association (YWCA) Hostess House, which was widely popular among soldiers.  Vanderbilt lifted the bans in September as the result of the public outcry generated by Cayton's articles.

Service at Camp Lewis
The 13 Division was briefly commanded by Brigadier General Frank B. Watson, with Vanderbilt taking command of the 25th Brigade.  When the permanent commander, Major General Joseph D. Leitch arrived in October 1918, Watson assumed command of the 26th Brigade.

In late September 1918, the Spanish influenza epidemic reached Camp Lewis, and the post soon averaged 10 deaths per week.  In early October, the 213th Engineer Regiment arrived for assignment to the 13th Division, and brought even more ill soldiers into the camp.  In an effort to halt the widening epidemic, Leitch imposed a quarantine on October 19.

A Tacoma Daily Ledger fundraising campaign to erect the world's largest flagpole at Camp Lewis culminated on October 12, 1918, when soldiers attempted to raise a 60-by-90-foot American flag which was mounted on a 314-foot-tall pole made from a Douglas fir tree.  The event was sparsely attended because of the flu quarantine, and soon after the pole went up, a gust of wind whipped the flag hard enough to snap the pole in three places.  An attempt to raise a 214-foot pole in November also met with failure, as the wind caught the flag during the dedication ceremony, snapped the pole into two pieces and shredded the flag.  A third, more traditional flagpole was successfully erected later in November.

The death of Alexander P. Cronkite

Major Alexander P. Cronkhite was a company commander in the 213th Engineers and the son of Major General Adelbert Cronkhite.  He arrived at Camp Lewis in early October, and was soon hospitalized with influenza.  Major Cronkhite was released on October 21, and joined his company for a cross-country hike.  Because he was still recovering, another officer was temporarily in command.  When the group stopped to rest and eat lunch, Cronkhite used a borrowed handgun to engage in target practice by shooting at a tobacco tin on a nearby fence post.  While engaged in this activity, Cronkhite sustained a gunshot wound and died at the scene.  Subsequent investigation found that it was accidental and self-inflicted.

Adelbert Cronkhite did not accept this finding, and pushed for several years to have the investigation reopened.  In the mid-1920s, the sergeant and captain who had been with Alexander Cronkhite when he died were arrested and charged with murder.  Because the captain was Jewish, Adelbert Cronkhite's cause was taken up by anti-Semitic newspapers, creating a nationwide story.  When the sergeant was tried, defense attorneys were able to demonstrate that an accidental shooting was the most likely possibility.  He was acquitted, and charges against the captain were soon dismissed.

Post-war
The armistice of November 11, 1918 ended World War I before the 13th Division could complete its training and depart for France.  Within a few days, Leitch began permitting the release of officers who were no longer needed, as well as soldiers who requested discharge so they could return home to support their families.  The 13th Division held a demobilization parade on November 22, 1918, with members of the local community watching primarily from their automobiles as a precaution against the spread of influenza.

The division was nearly demobilized by February 1919, except for the 13th Field Artillery Brigade, which was briefly employed in Seattle to help restore order during a labor strike.  Demobilization resumed again on February 25, and the soldiers of the 13th Field Artillery Brigade were soon discharged to civilian life.

Insignia
The 13th Division's shoulder sleeve insignia was approved by the War Department shortly before the division demobilized.  It consisted of a blue circle featuring the number 13 in white.  A black cat depicted above a red horseshoe open at the top were intended to represent hoodoo that the Germans could not defeat, and the good luck that the division expected to have during combat in France.

Commanders

Division commanders
Colonel Edward N. Jones Jr. (Interim), July 17, 1918
Brigadier General Cornelius Vanderbilt III (Interim), August 20, 1918
Brigadier General Frank B. Watson (Interim), September 11, 1918
Major General Joseph D. Leitch, October 7, 1918

Brigade commanders
Brigadier General Cornelius Vanderbilt III, 25th Infantry Brigade
Brigadier General Frank B. Watson, 26th Infantry Brigade
Brigadier General William Peirce Ennis, 13th Field Artillery Brigade

See also
 World War II unit named 13th Airborne Division

References

Infantry divisions of the United States Army
Military units and formations established in 1918
Military units and formations disestablished in 1919
United States Army divisions of World War I